The 2019 Buckle Up in Your Truck 225 was a NASCAR Gander Outdoors Truck Series race held on July 11, 2019, at Kentucky Speedway in Sparta, Kentucky. Contested over 150 laps on the  tri-oval speedway, it was the 13th race of the 2019 NASCAR Gander Outdoors Truck Series season.

Background

Track

The track is a  tri-oval speedway in Sparta, Kentucky, which has hosted ARCA, NASCAR and Indy Racing League racing annually since it opened in 2000. The track is currently owned and operated by Speedway Motorsports. The speedway has a grandstand capacity of 69,000.

Entry list

Practice

First practice

Final practice

Qualifying

Qualifying results

Race

Summary
Grant Enfinger started on pole, but Sheldon Creed took the lead within the first turn and pulled away. He eventually held a two-second lead over Enfinger and won Stage 1.

With 5 laps remaining in Stage 2, Enfinger and Brandon Jones tangled together while battling for the lead. Enfinger dove underneath Jones but lost control and ended up pulling them both into the outside wall. Matt Crafton won the stage under caution. Tyler Ankrum passed Crafton soon after the caution and dominated until he had to pit and was overtaken by Brett Moffitt. He then led for 10 laps until Dylan Lupton and Crafton both took the lead on separate occasions.

Brett Moffitt retook the lead on lap 125, but had to pit for fuel on the final lap. This gave the lead to Ankrum, who ultimately led a race-high 40 laps. Ankrum won the race with a 7-second lead over runner-up Stewart Friesen (who had to start in a backup truck).

Stage Results

Stage One
Laps: 35

Stage Two
Laps: 35

Final Stage Results

Stage Three
Laps: 80

References

NASCAR races at Kentucky Speedway
2019 in sports in Kentucky
Buckle Up in Your Truck 225